Koncz is a Hungarian surname that may refer to
Christoph Koncz (born 1987), Austrian violinist
Ferenc Koncz (1959–2020), Hungarian teacher and politician
Gábor Koncz (born 1938), Hungarian actor
Zsolt Koncz (born 1977), Hungarian football player 
Zsuzsa Koncz (born 1946), Hungarian pop singer

Hungarian-language surnames